The BYU–Utah State football rivalry is an American college football rivalry between the Brigham Young Cougars and Utah State Aggies.

They have met for the Old Wagon Wheel 65 times, dating back to 1948. However, the rivalry predates the Old Wagon Wheel trophy era. The rivalry series between the two schools was largely dominated in the early years by Utah State until 1974.  For the next three decades, BYU generally dominated the series with BYU winning ten straight times before the Aggies defeated the Cougars 31–16 on October 1, 2010. With the victory, Utah State reclaimed the Old Wagon Wheel for the first time since 1993. The Old Wagon Wheel also returned to Utah State on October 3, 2014, when they beat BYU 35–20. Starting in 1981, the two teams have usually met on the first Friday of October, which has certain significance since it is generally the same weekend that the Church of Jesus Christ of Latter-day Saints (LDS) holds its semiannual worldwide General Conference.

The battle for the Old Wagon Wheel is an important cultural event in the state of Utah given the longstanding rivalry between the two schools and the fact that the majority of the student body at both schools recognize themselves to be members of the Church of Jesus Christ of Latter-day Saints. Many families with LDS association, both within and outside the state of Utah, have familial ties to both institutions.

BYU announced they have canceled the following four games (2023-2026) they had agreed to in their contract, as their move into the Big 12 will require them to accommodate conference schedules. The contract did have a clause designed for such a scenario as conference affiliation changes. It is unclear after 2022 when the rivalry will continue.

Game results

See also  
 List of NCAA college football rivalry games
 Beehive Boot

References

College football rivalries in the United States
BYU Cougars football
Utah State Aggies football
1922 establishments in Utah